An adding machine is a class of mechanical calculator, usually specialized for bookkeeping calculations.
In the United States, the earliest adding machines were usually built to read in dollars and cents. Adding machines were ubiquitous office equipment until they were phased out in favor of calculators in the 1970s and by personal computers beginning in about 1985. The older adding machines were rarely seen in American office settings by the year 2000.

Blaise Pascal and Wilhelm Schickard were the two original inventors of the mechanical calculator in 1642. For Pascal, this was an adding machine that could perform additions and subtractions directly and multiplication and divisions by repetitions, while Schickard's machine, invented several decades earlier, was less functionally efficient but was supported by a mechanised form of multiplication tables. These two were followed by a series of inventors and inventions leading to those of Thomas de Colmar, who launched the mechanical calculator industry in 1851 when he released his simplified arithmometer (it took him thirty years to refine his machine, patented in 1820, into a simpler and more reliable form).  However, they did not gain widespread use until Dorr E. Felt started manufacturing his comptometer (1887) and Burroughs started the commercialization of differently conceived adding machines (1892).

Operation
To add a new list of numbers and arrive at a total, the user was first required to "ZERO" the machine. Then, to add sets of numbers, the user was required to press numbered keys on a keyboard, which would remain depressed (rather than immediately rebound like the keys of a computer keyboard or typewriter or the buttons of a typical modern machine).  The user would then pull the crank, which caused the numbers to be shown on the rotary wheels, and the keys to be released (i.e. to pop back up) in preparation for the next input. To add, for example, the amounts of 30.72 and 4.49 (which, in adding machine terms, on a decimal adding machine is 3,072 plus 449 "decimal units"), the following process took place: Press the  key in the column fourth from the right (multiples of one thousand), the  key in the column second from right (multiples of ten) and the  key in the rightmost column (multiples of 1). Pull the crank. The rotary wheels now showed 3072. Press the  key in the third column from the right, the  key in the second column from right, and the  key in the rightmost column. Pull the crank. The rotary wheels now show a running 'total' of 3521 which, when interpreted using the decimal currency colour-coding of the key columns, equates to 35.21. Keyboards typically did not have or need  (zero) keys; one simply did not press any key in the column containing a zero. Trailing zeros (those to the right of a number), were there by default because when a machine was zeroed, all numbers visible on the rotary wheels were reset to zero.  

Subtraction was impossible, except by adding the complement of a number (for instance, subtract 2.50 by adding 9,997.50).

Multiplication was a simple process of keying in the numbers one or more columns to the left and repeating the "addition" process. For example, to multiply 34.72 by 102, key in 3472, pull crank, repeat once more. Wheels show 6944. Key in 3472(00), pull crank. Wheels now show 354144, or 3,541.44.

A later adding machine, called the comptometer, did not require that a crank be pulled to add. Numbers were input simply by pressing keys. The machine was thus driven by finger power. Multiplication was similar to that on the adding machine, but users would "form" up their fingers over the keys to be pressed and press them down the multiple of times required. That finger shape would then move left two columns and press once. Usually a small crank near the wheels would be used to zero them. Subtraction was possible by adding complementary numbers; keys would also carry a smaller, complementary digit to help the user form complementary numbers. Division was also possible by putting the dividend to the left end and performing repeated subtractions by using the complementary method.

Some adding machines were electromechanical — an old-style mechanism, but driven by electric power.

These machines could subtract as well as add. Some could multiply and divide, although including these operations made the machine more complex. Those that could multiply, used a form of the old adding machine multiplication method. Using the previous example of multiplying 34.72 by 102, the amount was keyed in, then the 2 key in the "multiplication" key column was pressed. The machine cycled twice, then tabulated the adding mechanism below the keyboard one column to the right. The number keys remained locked down on the keyboard. The user now pressed the multiplication  key which caused tabulation of the adding mechanism one more column to the right, but did not cycle the machine. Now the user pressed the multiplication  key. The machine cycled once. To see the total the user was required to press a  key and the machine would print the result on a paper tape, release the locked down keys, reset the adding mechanism to zero and tabulate it back to its home position.

Modern adding machines are like simple calculators. They often have a different input system, though.

 
Sometimes, the plus key is even labeled thus:

Burroughs's calculating machine

William Seward Burroughs received a patent for his adding machine on August 25, 1888. He was a founder of American Arithmometer Company, which became Burroughs Corporation and  evolved to produce electronic billing machines and mainframes, and eventually merged with Sperry to form Unisys. The grandson of the inventor of the adding machine is Beat author William S. Burroughs; a collection of his essays is called The Adding Machine.

See also
 Adder (electronics)
 Cash register
 Standard Adding Machine Company

Notes

Sources

External links

Mechanical calculators
Office equipment
1642 introductions